Wendy J. Fox (born 1979) is an American author born in Washington. She is most known as a writer of fiction and has twice been a finalist for the Colorado Book Awards. In 2015, she was nominated for her collection "The Seven Stages of Anger and Other Stories" and in 2020, she was a finalist in literary fiction for "If the Ice Had Held." Fox has published short stories in ZYZZYVA, Tampa Review, The Pinch, and Washington Square Review, among others. She has also written for popular magazine outlets like Self, Business Insider, and The Rumpus. She was included in 2006's Tales from the Expat Harem, an anthology of female writers based on the experiences of living in Turkey. She currently resides in Denver, Colorado.

Early life and education 
Fox was born and raised in rural eastern Washington state. She attended Tonasket High School and Wenatchee Valley College. She matriculated from Western Washington University and went on to Eastern Washington University, where she earned an Master of Fine Arts.

Career 
Until 2019, Fox worked as a marketer for a technology company, and had worked in information technology sector since 2006. She has been outspoken about the need for artists to have a "day job."

Awards and recognition 
 Press 53’s inaugural short-fiction competition for her collection "The Seven Stages of Anger and Other Stories."
 "The Pull of It", a novel named a top read by Displaced Nation.
 SFWP's Grand Prize for "If the Ice Had Held"

Bibliography 
  The Seven Stages of Anger and Other Stories (2014) Press 53
  The Pull of It (2016) Underground Voices
  If the Ice Had Held (2019) Santa Fe Writers Project

References

External links 
 Official website

1979 births
Living people
Western Washington University alumni
Eastern Washington University alumni
American women writers
People from Tonasket, Washington
21st-century American women